Raymond Bridgman Cowles (pronounced "coals"; 1896–1975) was a herpetologist and professor at University of California, Los Angeles. Born in the British Colony of Natal (in what is now KwaZulu-Natal, South Africa) to American missionary parents, he emigrated to the United States in the early 1900s. He attended Pomona College as an undergrad and earned his PhD at Cornell University under Albert Hazen Wright. He is known for his research on desert ecology and reptile thermoregulation, as well as his popular books on environmental conservation. Cowles died of a heart attack in 1975 at the age of 79. An obituary called him one of America's first ecologists and conservationists.

Cowles is commemorated in the scientific names of three reptiles: the White Sands prairie lizard (Sceloporus cowlesi), the Angolan coral snake (Aspidelaps lubricus cowlesi), and the Yuman Desert fringe-toed lizard (Uma cowlesi).

Books

References

External links
Guide to the Raymond B. Cowles Papers, UC Santa Barbara, at Online Archive of California

1896 births
1975 deaths
American herpetologists
American ecologists
People from Natal
Cornell University alumni
University of California, Los Angeles faculty
Pomona College alumni
20th-century American zoologists
Emigrants from the Colony of Natal to the United States